Government Degree College Hamirpur better known as Neta Ji Subash Chandra Bose Memorial PG College is a government college located in Anu Hamirpur, Himachal Pradesh, India. The college is affiliated with Himachal Pradesh University.

Background 
Government College Anu Hamirpur is located in the district headquarter of Hamirpur. The college was originally named Government Degree College, but in 1995 it changed its name to Neta Ji Subash Chandera Bose Memorial College Hamirpur. The college near  traveling sources Airport, Gaggal Airport Dharmashala , Kangra,  Railway Station  In Una, Una Himachal Railway Station and Bus Stand Hamirpur.

References

External links 
 Official website

Colleges in India
1965 establishments in India